The Young-Sartorius House is a historic home located at Pocomoke City, Worcester County, Maryland.  It is a -story, center-passage / single-pile frame dwelling built in two stages between about 1860 and about 1900.

It was listed on the National Register of Historic Places in 1996.

References

External links
, including photo from 1994, at Maryland Historical Trust

Houses in Worcester County, Maryland
Houses on the National Register of Historic Places in Maryland
Queen Anne architecture in Maryland
Houses completed in 1860
National Register of Historic Places in Worcester County, Maryland